China: An International Journal covers politics, economics, society, geography, law, culture and international relations in modern China, including Hong Kong, Macau, and Taiwan.

Abstracting and indexing 
The journal is abstracted in Social Sciences Citation Index®, Journal Citation Reports/Social Sciences Edition, Current Contents®/Social and Behavioral Sciences, International Bibliography of the Social Sciences, Bibliography of Asian Studies and Econlit.

References 

Publications established in 2003
Chinese studies journals
English-language journals